Had Sahary District is a district of Djelfa Province, Algeria.

Municipalities
The district is further divided into 3 municipalities:
Had-Sahary
Bouira Lahdab
Aïn Feka

Districts of Djelfa Province